Michele Bianchi was a  of the Italian Regia Marina that saw action in the Second World War. The submarine, (pennant number BH), was launched on 3 December 1939.

Her first war patrol was in the Mediterranean Sea from 15 August to 3 September 1940. Michele Bianchi sailed on 27 October 1940 and reached the Strait of Gibraltar on 3 November. Her attempted transit to the Atlantic was detected by Royal Navy forces, and Michele Bianchi took refuge in the neutral port of Tangier. Michele Bianchi left Tangier on 12 November and reached Bordeaux on 18 December 1940.

Michele Bianchi sank four ships on her first BETASOM patrol from Bordeaux; but the next patrol from 30 April to 30 May 1941 was unsuccessful.

References

External links
 Michele Bianchi Marina Militare website

1939 ships
Ships built in La Spezia
Marconi-class submarines
World War II submarines of Italy
Ships sunk by British submarines
World War II shipwrecks in the Atlantic Ocean
Maritime incidents in July 1941
Warships lost in combat with all hands
Submarines sunk by submarines